Çäçe is the name of a rural council and its associated village in Kaka District, Ahal Province, southern Turkmenistan near the border with Iran.

External links
Satellite map at Maplandia.com

References

Populated places in Ahal Region